Roche Ronde is a  mountain summit located at the south end of the Bosche Range in Jasper National Park, in the Canadian Rockies of Alberta, Canada. The peak may be seen from the Jasper House National Historic Site along Highway 16. The mountain was named for the rounded summit as Roche Ronde is French for "round rock".


Climate

Based on the Köppen climate classification, Roche Ronde is located in a subarctic climate with cold, snowy winters, and mild summers. Temperatures can drop below  with wind chill factors below .  Precipitation runoff from Roche Ronde drains into the Athabasca River.

See also
 Geography of Alberta

Gallery

References

External links
 Parks Canada web site: Jasper National Park

Two-thousanders of Alberta
Alberta's Rockies